Gambrill House, also known as Boscobel House and Edgewood, is a house near Frederick, Maryland in the Monocacy National Battlefield.  It was listed on the National Register of Historic Places in 1985.

The house is associated with James Gambrill, owner of nearby Araby Mill and the Frederick City Mill. Gambrill's house boasted advanced features such as hot and cold running water, imported Italian marble fireplaces, gas lamps and a coal furnace. Gambrill was forced by financial circumstances to give up the house and mills in 1893. The house was acquired by the National Park Service in 1983 and serves as the home of the NPS Historic Preservation Training Center.

References

External links

Gambrill House, Monocacy National Battlefield
, including photo in 2006, at Maryland Historical Trust

Houses on the National Register of Historic Places in Maryland
Houses completed in 1868
Houses in Frederick County, Maryland
Historic American Buildings Survey in Maryland
Historic American Landscapes Survey in Maryland
National Register of Historic Places in Frederick County, Maryland